Patricia Lewis (born 22 September 1967) is a South African singer, actress and television presenter.

Career

Music

Lewis's debut album, Don't Tempt Me was released in 1992. "Ek Is Lief Vir Jou" which was released in 1997, achieved sales of 125,000. Patricia was rewarded the 1st Artist in the history of South African music that could achieve the number of sales. "Wie Sou Jou Kon Liefhê Soos Ek" reached gold status on the day it was released in 1997. Lewis has performed duets with numerous local and international celebrities, including David Hasselhoff, Kurt Darren, Bles Bridges and Jim Reeves. To date, her albums have reached over 600,000 in total sales. September 2021 Patrica released her 1st "comeback" single in 11 years called Hello Hello, Ek het jou gemis followed by numerous radio interviews all over South Africa and Namibia.

Film and television

After a career in modelling, Lewis went on to star in various television shows, as well as an international film with Oliver Reed. She has presented a variety of television programmes, such as the SABC 2 reality series Blonde Ambisie and the Toyota Top 20. Lewis is the creator of the reality singing competition Supersterre, the third season of which aired in 2010. In 2009, she was diagnosed with cancer, whereafter she retired from public life. After four years, Lewis returned to television as a contestant on the celebrity edition of MasterChef South Africa in early 2015. She was also a contestant on the third season of Strictly Come Dancing in 2007. Patricia will be a guest on the 5th season of KykNET's Republiek van Zoid Afrika.

Personal life

Lewis was born in Transvaal, where she matriculated from Mondeor High School in 1985, which is an English-speaking high school located in the southern suburbs of Johannesburg, known primary schools she attended were Aloe Ridge Primary and Mondeor Primary School She is a former provincial gymnast. Patricia also worked at the polling stations for the National Party during apartheid with her mother Linda Lewis being a member and representative of the national party, in addition Linda was on the Johannesburg city council for the National Party in the 1980’s.  In May 2003, Lewis married Mark Whitfield, with whom she has a son, Max. Patricia and her family gave up the busy city life for a more relaxed life in 2007, she relocated from Gauteng to Ballito. Patricia quit the entertainment industry to be a full-time mother to her son Max and a support system for her husband Mark. 
In 2020, Patricia decided she wants to release a new album for her late mother Linda Lewis and her father Patrick Lewis but then lockdown happened and shortly after Patricia lost her mother due to Alzheimer's. In 2021 Patricia, Mark and their Son Max has decided due to popular demand, it's time for Patricia to hit the stage again and built her a home studio where she recorded her 1st song in 14 years.

Discography 

 Hello Hello, Ek het jou gemis (Single), 2021 Patricia Lewis Music
 First time I ever saw your face (Duet with Karen Zoid)(Single), 2018 Brainwave Productions 
 20 Goue treffers, 2014: Select Musiek/Sony Music Entertainment Africa
 Net Soos In Drome (Re-Issue) (includes duet with David Hasselhoff ), 2008 Vat 5 Musiek/Sony BMG Music Entertainment Africa 
 Net Soos In Drome, 2008 Vat 5 Musiek/Sony BMG Music Entertainment Africa
 10 Goue Jare: Die Grootste Treffers, 2006 Vat 5 Musiek/Sony BMG Music Entertainment Africa
 The DVD: 21 Grootste Treffers, 2004 Vat 5 Musiek/Sony BMG Music Entertainment Africa
 Special double CD 1: Sings Olivia Newton-John / CD 2: n Nuwe Lewe CD, 2004 Vat 5 Musiek/Sony BMG Entertainment Africa
 ´n Nuwe Lewe 2003 Vat 5 Musiek/BMG Africa
 Sings Olivia Newton-John (includes duet with Kurt Darren), 2002 Vat 5 Musiek/BMG Africa
 Vir Ewig En Altyd (spesiale uitgawe), Vat 5 Musiek/BMG Africa
 Vir Ewig En Altyd, 2000 Vat 5 Musiek/BMG Africa
 Jy's Die Een, 1999 Vat 5 Musiek/BMG Africa
 Duet, with Jurie Els, 1998 Vat 5 Musiek/BMG Africa
 Wie Sou Jou Kon Liefhê Soos Ek?, 1998 Vat 5 Musiek/BMG Africa
 Ek Is Lief Vir Jou, 1998 BSP/Vat 5 Musiek/BMG Africa
 Don't Tempt Me, 1992 GALLO
 Come on and shout (Debut Single)''', 1990 GALLO

References

Living people
20th-century South African women singers
21st-century South African women singers
South African actresses
People from Gauteng
1967 births
South African women television presenters